Giuseppe Firrao (1670–1744) was a Roman Catholic cardinal.

Biography
He is the Great-uncle of Cardinal Giuseppe Firrao (iuniore). On 11 Apr 1717, he was consecrated bishop by Johann Konrad von Reinach-Hirzbach, Bishop of Basel, with Johann Christoph Haus, Titular Bishop of Domitiopolis, and Konrad Ferdinand Geist von Wildegg, Titular Bishop of Tricale, serving as co-consecrators.

On 4 October 1733, Pope Clement XII appointed Firrao his Secretary of State.

Episcopal succession
While bishop, he was the principal consecrator of:

References

Bibliography
Cardella, Lorenzo (1794). Memorie storiche de' cardinali della Santa Romana Chiesa. Vol.VIII. Rome: Pagliarini, pp.  252–253. 
Pastor, Ludwig (von) (1941). The history of the popes, from the close of the middle ages. Vol. XXXIV (London: Kegan Paul). pp. 37, 181,
334. 338, 385. 386, 390, 403.
Weber, Christoph (1994). Legati e governatori dello Stato Pontificio : 1550-1809. Roma : Ministero per i beni culturali e ambientali, Ufficio centrale per i beni archivistici, pp. 117, 220, 282, 333, 418, 433 and 673. 

1670 births
1744 deaths
18th-century Italian cardinals
Apostolic Nuncios to Portugal
Apostolic Nuncios to Switzerland